Gamabuo is a village in Central District of Botswana. The village is located 50 km south-west of Serowe, and the population was 605 in 2001 census.

References

Populated places in Central District (Botswana)
Villages in Botswana